The 2010 Championship 1 was a semi-professional rugby league football competition played in the United Kingdom, the third tier of the sport in the country. The winner of this league, Hunslet Hawks, were promoted to the Co-operative Championship along with play-off winners, York City Knights. There was no relegation from this league as it is the lowest tier of professional rugby league in the UK.

All of the teams competed in the 2010 Challenge Cup but South Wales did not compete in the 2010 National League Cup.

2010 structure

The competition features mainly the same teams as it did in 2009. The exceptions being that the Dewsbury Rams and the Keighley Cougars were both promoted to compete in the 2010 RFL Championship. Originally, Doncaster and the Leigh Centurions were supposed to be relegated. However, Gateshead Thunder breached the insolvency laws which meant that it was they, instead of Leigh, who were relegated.

The competition was going to contain 10 teams but one more was added when the Super League team the Crusaders left their home base at Bridgend and moved to Wrexham. This resulted in a new club being formed in Neath, South Wales, called the South Wales Scorpions who will play at the Gnoll.

Table 

(a) Blackpool were docked 10 points for an operational rules breach.

(b): Gateshead were docked 6 points for entering administration.

2010 Playoffs

See also
 Co-operative Championship
 2010 RFL Championship
 Championship 1

References

External links
Official Championship website
RFL Championship coverage
Scores from Sky Sports
RugbyLeague.org Championship 1 Fans Forums

2010
Rugby Football League Championship
2010 in English rugby league
2010 in Welsh rugby league